Singles is the seventh compilation album by English rock band The Smiths, pitched as a compilation of previously issued singles. It was released in February 1995 by the new owner of their back catalogue, WEA (Sire Records in the United States). Its highest British chart position was #5; it did not chart in the United States. Blender magazine listed the album among the "500 CDs You Must Own" on their website.

Background

WEA (now the Warner Music Group) acquired the entire Smiths back catalogue in early 1992. After re-releasing all of The Smiths' original albums and compilations and issuing a two-volume best of compilation (Best...I and ...Best II) in 1992, they decided to celebrate The Smiths' reputation as a "singles band" by issuing a collection of the band's singles in 1995. Only the singles released in the UK were included.

Despite the album's title, the Singles versions of "Hand in Glove", "The Boy with the Thorn in His Side" and "Ask" were not the original single mixes. Similarly, "What Difference Does It Make?", "How Soon Is Now?", "That Joke Isn't Funny Anymore" and "Last Night I Dreamt That Somebody Loved Me" were the full-length album versions, that are on the original 12´ singles, as opposed to the original single edits.

Cover
The cover features previously unused artwork designed by Morrissey, featuring singer and actress Diana Dors in a still from the 1956 film Yield to the Night.

Spin-off singles
WEA decided to promote the album in the UK by re-releasing the "Ask" single with its two original B-sides, "Cemetry Gates" and "Golden Lights". The single charted at #62. In the United States, Sire decided to release "Sweet and Tender Hooligan", a single of rarities, to promote the album, with a newly designed sleeve by Morrissey. It failed to chart.

Track listing

Personnel

The Smiths

 Mike Joyce – drums
 Johnny Marr – guitars, keyboard instruments, harmonica, synthesized saxophone, string and flute arrangements
 Morrissey – vocals
 Andy Rourke – bass guitar, cello on "Shakespeare's Sister"

Additional musicians

 Craig Gannon – rhythm guitar on "Panic" and "Ask"
 Kirsty MacColl – backing vocals on "Ask"
 John Porter – slide guitar on "Sheila Take a Bow"
 Stephen Street – drum machine on "I Started Something I Couldn't Finish" and synthesized string arrangements on "Girlfriend in a Coma"

Certifications and sales

Notes

The Smiths compilation albums
1995 greatest hits albums
Albums produced by Stephen Street